Curtis De Leon (born 8 September 2003) is an American-born Trinidad and Tobago footballer who plays as a midfielder for USL Championship club North Carolina FC.

Club career

North Carolina FC
De Leon joined the North Carolina FC academy in 2019, where he played before signing an academy contract with the club's USL League One side for the 2021 season.

Whilst spending time with the team in League One, De Leon also played with the team's USL League Two side North Carolina FC U23.

He made his debut for the first team on June 11, 2021, appearing as an injury-time substitute in a 2–1 loss to Fort Lauderdale CF.

In the fall of 2021, De Leon left North Carolina to play college soccer at the University of Alabama at Birmingham.

International
In 2019, De Leon made four appearances for the Trinidad and Tobago under-17 team.

References

2003 births
Living people
American soccer players
Citizens of Trinidad and Tobago through descent
Trinidad and Tobago footballers
Trinidad and Tobago expatriate footballers
Trinidad and Tobago youth international footballers
Association football midfielders
North Carolina FC U23 players
North Carolina FC players
USL League One players
USL League Two players
Soccer players from North Carolina
Sportspeople from North Carolina
American sportspeople of Trinidad and Tobago descent
UAB Blazers men's soccer players